The Mother of Fraternities refers to two colleges: Union College and Miami University, both of which founded many early fraternities.

Union College was the site in which three fraternities in the United States, Kappa Alpha Society (1825), Sigma Phi Society (1827), and Delta Phi (1827), known collectively as the Union Triad, were founded.

Several other early alpha chapters in the Greek system, including Psi Upsilon (1833), Omicron Kappa Epsilon (1834), Chi Psi (1841), and Theta Delta Chi (1847), were founded at Union as well.

The Mother of Fraternities label is also used  to refer to Miami University based upon the rise of the Miami Triad: Beta Theta Pi (1839), Phi Delta Theta (1848) and Sigma Chi (1855), which were founded during the school's historical period known as "Old Miami".  After the school became reestablished, the alpha chapters of Delta Zeta sorority (1902) and Phi Kappa Tau (1906) were founded there.

Impact

The term "mother" also reflects the broader impact of the fraternity movement - both for men and for women - nationally.  It would take 45 years from the foundation and expansion of the men's social fraternities beginning in 1825 until the formation of the first of the women's fraternities, Kappa Alpha Theta in 1870.  The term "sorority" wouldn't come into popular use until the 1890s, some years after it was coined for young Gamma Phi Beta in 1882. Thus, the model for Greek organizations and how rival groups related to each other in a nascent balance of rivalry and inter-fraternalism was set into motion by these early fraternities at Union and Miami, rightly earning those schools the moniker of Mother of Fraternities.

Other fraternal groupings are also celebrated. Some are called Duos, some Triads and for women's groups there is the Farmville Four: Four sororities were born at Longwood University, collectively known as the Farmville Four. These include Kappa Delta (1897), Sigma Sigma Sigma (1898), Zeta Tau Alpha (1898), and Alpha Sigma Alpha (1901). The four faces of the campus bell tower commemorate these four organizations.

See also
 Triad (American fraternities)

References

Fraternities and sororities in the United States
Miami University